The Gouin dam is a river infrastructure that created the Gouin Reservoir. This dam is the source of the Saint-Maurice River and is located in the town of La Tuque, in Mauricie, in province Quebec, in Canada.

Toponymy 
The Gouin dam owes its name to Lomer Gouin (1861-1929), who was premier of Quebec between 1905 and 1920, federal minister of justice between 1921 and 1924 and Lieutenant Governor of Quebec in 1929.

Geography 
The Kikendatch Bay is formed by the Gouin dam which is located at:
  west of the mouth of the Wabano River (confluence with the Saint-Maurice River)
  south-east of the center of the village of Obedjiwan which is located on a peninsula on the north shore of Gouin Reservoir
  north-west of the center of the village of Wemotaci (north shore of the Saint-Maurice River)
  north-west of downtown La Tuque
  northwest of the mouth of the Saint-Maurice river (confluence with the St. Lawrence River at Trois-Rivières).

Infrastructure 
Completed in 1948, the dam is equipped with a mini-hydroelectric power station fitted with two turbine-generator sets of 300 kW each, in order to meet the needs of the dam itself, of the staff residences of Hydro-Québec assigned to its maintenance and an outfitter located nearby.

 Height of the dam: 
 Holding capacity: 
 Height of the reservoir: 
 Length of the structure: 
 Type of dam: Concrete-gravity
 Type of foundation land: Roc. Class: A
 Level of consequences: Considerable
 Seismic zone: 1
 Reservoir area: 
 Watershed area:

See also 
 Saint-Maurice River, a stream
 Gouin Reservoir, a body of water
 La Loutre Dam,
 Kikendatch Bay, one pass
 List of dams in Quebec

References 

Dams in Quebec
La Tuque, Quebec
Gouin Reservoir
Buildings and structures in Mauricie